{{DISPLAYTITLE:C21H28N2O2}}
The molecular formula C21H28N2O2 may refer to:

 Ibogaline, an alkaloid found in Tabernanthe iboga
 Optochin, a derivative of hydroquinine

Molecular formulas